American Hockey Association may refer to:

 American Hockey Association (1926–1942), a minor pro league existing between 1926 and 1942
 American Hockey Association (1992–1993), a minor pro league existing between 1992 and 1993